Suzhou Bus Rapid Transit is a bus rapid transit system in Suzhou, Jiangsu, China. It began operation in 2008 with 27.1 km of service. And the system was expanded in 2008, 2009 and 2010 now Suzhou BRT operations 5 lines, 106 bus stations within total 95 kilometers journey. The 5 lines whole journey are fully operation in Bus Express Lane Road and Elevated Road to ensure on-schedule and express travel.

References

Transport in Suzhou
Bus rapid transit in China